Wādī Bertema is a wadi located at Latitude: 33°31'59.98" and Longitude: 10°40'59.99" in Madanīn, Tunisia. The river flows from Metameur to Boughrara on the gulf of Tunis, and being a coastal waterway the elevation above sea level is 1 meter.

The ruins of the Roman town of  Gigthi  are close by.

References

Rivers of Tunisia